Hebi railway station is a station on Beijing–Guangzhou railway in Qibin District, Hebi, Henan.

History
The station was formerly known as Xunxian railway station. It was changed to its current name in 1992 with the relocation of Hebi Prefecture People's Government.

References

Railway stations in Henan
Stations on the Beijing–Guangzhou Railway
Railway stations in China opened in 1904